Dariyapur may refer to:

 Dariyapur, Bhopal, a village in Madhya Pradesh, India
 Dariyapur, Nalanda, a village in Bihar, India